German submarine U-466 was a Type VIIC U-boat built for Nazi Germany's Kriegsmarine for service during World War II.
She was scuttled at sea on 19 August 1944.

She was laid down on 24 May 1941 by Deutsche Werke AG in Kiel as yard number 297, launched on 30 March 1942 and commissioned under Kapitänleutnant Gerhard Thäter, who remained with her for the rest of her career. U-466 bore a "heart & sunburst" emblem on her conning tower.

She began her service life in the 5th U-boat Flotilla, a training organization, before moving on to the 3rd and 29th flotillas for operational duties.

U-466 undertook five war patrols, spending a total of 182 days at sea, with no ships sunk or damaged. She was a member of six wolfpacks.

Design
German Type VIIC submarines were preceded by the shorter Type VIIB submarines. U-466 had a displacement of  when at the surface and  while submerged. She had two shafts and two  propellers.

U-466 was fitted with five  torpedo tubes (four fitted at the bow and one at the stern), fourteen torpedoes, one  SK C/35 naval gun, 220 rounds, and one twin  C/30 anti-aircraft gun. The boat had a complement of between forty-four and sixty.

Service history

First and second patrols
The U-boat departed Kiel for her first patrol on 12 January 1943. She made her way to the Atlantic from Kiel through the so-called Faeroes gap - the stretch of water between Iceland and the Faeroe Islands. She arrived in La Pallice in occupied France via a spot southeast of Greenland on the 29th.

Her second sortie also took her out into the mid-Atlantic. She departed La Pallice on 17 April 1943 and returned to the same place on 26 May after 40 days at sea.

Third and fourth patrols
Her third foray took her to a point off Suriname in South America. She was unsuccessfully attacked by US B-18 'Bolo' and B-24 Liberator aircraft on 23 July 1943. A day later, she was attacked by a B-24 which dropped five depth charges. This time the boat sustained damage. Five men were wounded, including the first officer.

The boat's fourth patrol was cut short when she was badly damaged following an attack by escort vessels from Convoy MKS 29. The submarine returned to her French base on 19 November 1943 after only 35 days away.

Fifth patrol
Her fifth patrol involved the U-boat's passage to Toulon in southern France. This voyage included trafficking the heavily defended Strait of Gibraltar. She passed the Rock on 22 March 1944 and arrived in Toulon on the 30th, having been attacked by the British submarine . The vessel fired four torpedoes at the U-boat; they all missed.

Loss
U-466 was severely damaged in a United States Army Air Forces raid on Toulon. As a result, she was scuttled on 19 August 1944 following the Allied invasion of southern France (Operation Dragoon). She was the last U-boat to be scuttled in the Mediterranean.

Wolfpacks
U-466 took part in six wolfpacks, namely:
 Haudegen (26 – 29 January 1943) 
 Amsel (22 April – 3 May 1943) 
 Amsel 4 (3 – 6 May 1943) 
 Rhein (7 – 10 May 1943) 
 Elbe 2 (10 – 13 May 1943) 
 Schill (25 October – 10 November 1943)

See also
 Mediterranean U-boat Campaign (World War II)

References

Bibliography

External links

Captain Gerhard Thäter

German Type VIIC submarines
World War II submarines of Germany
1942 ships
U-boats commissioned in 1942
U-boats scuttled in 1944
Ships built in Kiel
Maritime incidents in August 1944